The Bundesvision Song Contest 2008 was the fourth edition of the annual Bundesvision Song Contest musical event. The contest was held on 14 February 2008 at the TUI Arena in Hanover, Lower Saxony, following Oomph! feat. Marta Jandová's win in the 2007 contest in Berlin with the song "Träumst du?". The show was hosted by Stefan Raab, Johanna Klum, and Elton in the green room. At the beginning of the contest, the Minister President of Lower Saxony Christian Wulff was welcomed into the arena and presented as a "patron" of the contest.

The participants and their states were announced between 21 January and 13 February 2008 on TV total.

The winner of the Bundesvision Song Contest 2008 was Subway to Sally with the song "Auf Kiel", representing Brandenburg. In second place was Clueso representing Thuringia, and third place to Down Below representing Saxony-Anhalt.

Returning artists include: Clueso who participated for Thuringia for a second time after the 2005 contest. Peter Brugger returns as a member of Sportfreunde Stiller, having previously appeared in the band TipTop in 2006, both for Bavaria. Mamadee, who took part in 2005 with Gentleman, returns as part of the band Sisters, both for North Rhine-Westphalia. Favourites, established groups, and artists such as Sportfreunde Stiller, Laith Al-Deen, and Culcha Candela did not fare well compared to many newcomers to the contest.

15 of the 16 states awarded themselves the maximum of 12 points, with North Rhine-Westphalia awarding themselves 10 points.

The contest was broadcast by ProSieben and watched by 1.58 million people (8% market share). In the 14-49 age range 1.31 million people watched the contest (15% market share). Since the first competition in 2005, the number of viewers has fallen continuously, but the market share has increased from 7.6% in 2007, to 8% in 2008.

On 29 February 2008, 12 of the 16 songs placed in the top 100 of the German charts, with eight in the top 50. Clueso, and Das Bo's songs went straight to numbers 15 and 16 respectively.

Results

Scoreboard

References

External links
 Official BSC website at tvtotal.de

2008
Bundesvision Song Contest
2008 song contests